Schizochytrium limacinum is a species of thraustochytrids first isolated from a mangrove area in the western Pacific Ocean. It differs from other Schizochytrium species in its limaciform amoeboid cells, the size of its zoospores, and its assimilation profile of carbon sources.

References

Further reading

External links

Bigyra
Protists described in 1998
Labyrinthulean species